The Hart Tree is a Giant sequoia (Sequoiadendron giganteum) tree within the Redwood Mountain Grove, in the Sierra Nevada and Fresno County, California. The Redwood Mountain Grove is protected within Kings Canyon National Park and the Giant Sequoia National Monument. It is the 25th largest giant sequoia in the world, and could be considered the 24th largest depending on how badly Ishi Giant atrophied during the Rough Fire in 2015.

Description
It was once claimed to be the fourth largest Giant sequoia in the world, but is now considered the 24th largest.

The tree was named for Michael Hart, who discovered it sometime around 1880.

Dimensions

See also
 List of largest giant sequoias
 List of individual trees

References

Individual giant sequoia trees
Giant Sequoia National Monument
Kings Canyon National Park
Natural history of Fresno County, California